The Hu–Wen Administration, or Hu–Wen New Administration is the name given to the Chinese leadership that officially succeeded Jiang Zemin, Li Peng and Zhu Rongji in 2002. Using the two leaders' surnames, it is abbreviated as Hu–Wen.

This phrase is named after the general secretary of the Chinese Communist Party (CCP) and Chinese president Hu Jintao and premier Wen Jiabao, who are considered the 4th generation Chinese leaders and are viewed as, at least ostensibly, more reform-oriented and more open-minded and have been praised by political observers. Hu's contributions to the CCP ideology are officially termed the Scientific Outlook on Development.

CPC Politburo Standing Committee

16th PSC

17th PSC

The Presidency

Congress and Conference leaders

The State Council

See also 

 Generations of Chinese leadership
 Xi–Li Administration

Hu Jintao
Government of China
21st century in China